Myrceugenia bracteosa is a species of plant in the family Myrtaceae. It is endemic to Brazil.

References

bracteosa
Endemic flora of Brazil
Flora of the Atlantic Forest
Vulnerable flora of South America
Taxonomy articles created by Polbot